Vanessa Le Page (born February 24, 1970) is a Canadian cake artist. Born in Toronto, Ontario, she is the daughter of Canadian artist T. Denis Le Page (1934–2010), and Alidë Camilleri-Kohlhaas (formerly Lorraine Le Page), journalist, author, and translator. At the age of three, her family moved to Niagara Falls, where she grew up as an only child, just a stone's throw from the Falls, and from all of Clifton Hill's wax museums, and amusement park rides at Maple Leaf Village (now the site of the casino).

Music and the arts were an integral part of her upbringing, regularly attending the plays, concerts and dance performances her mother critiqued for a living (in addition to reporting on hard news, which resulted in a few late night fire scenes, which Vanessa also attended). Not being very physically inclined, arts and crafts were a constant distraction. From 1979 to 1985 she attended the Ray Wickens' School of Drama in St. Catharines.

After her parents' separation in 1985, Vanessa helped her father establish the T. Denis Le Page School of Fine Arts (SOFA) in his home, where he taught small, private art classes. In the fall of 1988 she moved back to Toronto (along with then partner, musician, Richard Konik) to attend the Ontario College of Art (OCA, now OCAD), from which she promptly withdrew by Christmas. In January 1989 she began to work at Dufflet Pastries as a cake 'finisher'. Within six months she was a night supervisor, and also began specialty cake work on the side, for which she was soon winning awards from the Canadian Society of Sugar Artistry (CSSA). As well, she designed and created window displays for Dufflet's retail outlet. In January 1994 she left Dufflet Pastries to pursue specialty cake-making full-time, under the banner The Cake Lady - Edible Art by Vanessa Le Page.

Vanessa's inspiration and enthusiasm for food preparation began early on. At the age of four, when her mother worked as the promotion manager for the Skylon Tower, she became enamoured of the restaurant's head chef, and all of his creations, including elaborate specialty cakes. At home, helping her mother to cook and bake also began quite early. By age 12, the profession of pastry chef became a strong contender for future plans, inspired in part by Jacqueline Bisset's role as such in the caper Who Is Killing The Great Chefs of Europe? But by age 14, being quite adept with a sewing machine, she began sewing her own clothes and decided upon fashion design as her ultimate career choice. Plans in that direction went awry after deciding to attend OCA instead of Sheridan College's fashion program. Fate quickly intervened when the bakery job at Dufflet's presented itself and Vanessa returned to her original plans.

She has been featured on television several times, including one appearance to speak about her Le Page's Glue collection. (She is a direct descendant of William Nelson Le Page the inventor of the glue). From 1999 to 2006 she occasionally took time out to work as a 'background performer' on many of the film and TV productions being shot in and around Toronto during the peak of filming activity in the city. She has produced cakes for use on screen including for the film The Fives Senses, the programme My Fabulous Gay Wedding, and for various advertisements. Her secret desire is to have a 'quirky' cooking show of some kind some day, and author accompanying cookbooks.

References

External links 
http://www.thecakelady.ca/
http://www.thecakelady.ca/lepagesglue
http://www.imdb.com/name/nm0503221/
http://www.chefdb.com/nm/18499/
https://web.archive.org/web/20120302204850/http://www.canadiantheatrecritics.ca/members.html#koh
http://www.lancetteer.com/Biography-Alide-Kohlhaas.htm
http://www.artlarson.org/veranstaltungen.html
http://tdenislepage.com/

1970 births
Living people
People from Toronto
Canadian women chefs
Women chefs